Hensmania is a genus of herbs in the family Asphodelaceae, first described as a genus in 1903 by William Vincent Fitzgerald. The entire genus is endemic to the State of Western Australia.

Species in this genus are tufted herbs where the major photosynthesis occurs in the stems.

Species
 Hensmania chapmanii Keighery, Fl. Australia 45: 486 (1987)
 Hensmania stoniella Keighery, Fl. Australia 45: 486 (1987)
 Hensmania turbinata (Endl.) W.Fitzg., Proc. Linn. Soc. New South Wales 28: 106 (1903)

References

Asphodelaceae genera
Hemerocallidoideae
Endemic flora of Australia
Taxa named by William Vincent Fitzgerald
Plants described in 1903